Coccinia pwaniensis is an East African species of Coccinia that was first described in 2010.

Description 
Perennial, dioecious climber. Shoot length up to 3 m. Young shoots are glabrous and green and later make a grey to reddish-grey bark. Leaves are alternate with 0.6 to 4.1 cm long petiole, lamina 2–10 × 2.7–11.4 cm, shallowly to profoundly 3-lobate (rarely 5-lobate). Upper lamina glabrous with clear to whitish pustules. Lower lamina and petiole with sparse hairs that appear wart-like when broken off. Tendrils simple. Probracts 2–3 mm long.

Flowers in male plants in long many-flowered racemes, in female plants solitary. Calyx with 5 very acute ("subulate"), 2.5–3.5  mm long lobes. Corolla 1.7–2.6 cm long, pale yellowish-orange. Stamens in male flowers 3, combined to a single column. Anthers sinuate, in a globose head. Fruits short cylindrical, 6.2–8.0 cm long and 1.8–2.3 cm in diameter. Seeds 6.5–7.0 × 4.0–4.5 × ca. 1.5 mm (L/W/H), symmetrically obovate, face lenticular.

Distribution 

Coccinia pwaniensis occurs along the margins of northern East African coastal forests in SE Kenya, E and NE Tanzania.

Etymology 
The epithet is derived from the Swahili word for "coast", referring to the distribution of the species.

Hybridization 
The species is known to produce sterile hybrids with Coccinia grandis in the wild.

References 

 
 

pwaniensis